Thomas Michael Geoffrey "Tom" Hansell (24 August 1954 – 14 November 2017) was an English first-class cricketer active from 1975 to 1977 who played for Surrey. Willeton District Cricket Club has constructed batting nets to honor and celebrate the life of Hansell and his influence on their club.

Batting 
Hansell batted left-handed. Throughout his first-class career, he had 319 runs.

Bowling 
Hansell's bowling style was slow left-arm orthodox.

References

1954 births
2017 deaths
English cricketers
Surrey cricketers